German submarine U-874 was a long-range Type IXD2 U-boat built for Nazi Germany's Kriegsmarine during World War II.

She was ordered on 25 August 1941, and was laid down on 17 March 1943 at DeSchiMAG AG Weser, Bremen, as yard number 1082. She was launched on 21 December 1943 and commissioned under the command of Oberleutnant zur See Theodor Petersen on 8 April 1944.

Design
German Type IXD2 submarines were considerably larger than the original Type IXs. U-874 had a displacement of  when at the surface and  while submerged. She had two shafts and two  propellers.

U-874 was fitted with six  torpedo tubes (four fitted at the bow and two at the stern), 24 torpedoes, one  SK C/32 naval gun, 150 rounds, and a  Flak M42 with 2575 rounds as well as two  C/30 anti-aircraft guns with 8100 rounds. The boat had a complement of fifty-five.

Service history
On 9 May 1945, U-874 surrendered at Horten, Norway. She was later transferred to Lisahally, Northern Ireland on 29 May 1945. Of the 156 U-boats that eventually surrendered to the Allied forces at the end of the war, U-874 was one of 116 selected to take part in Operation Deadlight. U-874 was towed out on 31 December 1945, and sunk.

References

Bibliography

External links

World War II submarines of Germany
German Type IX submarines
Ships built in Bremen (state)
1943 ships
U-boats commissioned in 1944
U-boats sunk in 1945
Maritime incidents in December 1945
World War II shipwrecks in the Atlantic Ocean
Operation Deadlight